Chantal Biya (born 4 December 1969) is the first lady of Cameroon.

Early life

Chantal Biya was born in Dimako, East Province, Cameroon. Her father was French expatriate Georges Vigouroux and her mother, Miss Doumé pageant winner, Rosette Ndongo Mengolo. Her mother was elected mayor of Bangou following the July 2007 municipal elections.

She spent her adolescence in Yaoundé.

Philanthropy

Bertrand Teyou
In November 2010, Bertrand Teyou published a book titled  (English: "The Belle of the Banana Republic: ChantalBiya, from the Streets to the Palace"), tracing Biya's rise from humble origins to become First Lady. He was subsequently given a two-year prison term on charges of "insult to character" and organising an "illegal demonstration" for attempting to hold a public reading. Amnesty International and PEN International's Writers in Prison Committee both protested his arrest and issued appeals on his behalf; Amnesty International also named him a prisoner of conscience. He was freed in April 2011 when a well wisher agreed to pay his fine in order that he might seek treatment for his worsening health.

Personal life

She married Paul Biya, who is 36-years older than her, on 23 April 1994, after his first wife, Jeanne-Irène Biya, died in 1992.

She is well known for her hairstyles. Her signature style is called the banane, and is used for formal occasions. Biya has popularised other styles; collectively, they are known as the Chantal Biya. She is also known for her exotic wardrobe. Among her favourite designers are high-end Western labels such as Chanel, Dior and Louis Vuitton.

References

Bibliography

 .
 Dorall, Charyl, ed. (2004). Commonwealth Ministers Reference Book 2003. Commonwealth Secretariat.
 .
 .
 .
 
 .
 .
 
 .
 .
 .

External links

 

1970 births
Living people
First ladies of Cameroon
People from East Region (Cameroon)
Cameroonian philanthropists
Cameroonian people of French descent
UNESCO Goodwill Ambassadors